Samantha Ruth Prabhu is an Indian actress and model who has appeared predominantly in Telugu and Tamil films. She made her acting debut in 2010 with Gautham Vasudev Menon's Telugu romance film Ye Maaya Chesave. The film fetched her the Filmfare Award for Best Female Debut – South and a Nandi Award. In 2012, Samantha featured in live action Telugu-Tamil bilingual project Eega. The film received positive reviews and was one of the highest-grossing Telugu films of the year, earning 1.15 billion globally. Her performance as a micro artist who runs a NGO and takes revenge for the murder of her lover earned her Filmfare Award for Best Telugu Actress. 
In the same year, she appeared in trilingual romantic drama Neethaane En Ponvasantham (2012). The film earned her praise from critics, and Samantha won her first Filmfare Award for Best Tamil Actress. Year 2012, became her most prolific award-winning year and she secured further recognition for Best Actress at the Vijay Awards, Santosham Film Awards and the CineMAA Awards.

Between 2013 and 2015 Samantha has primarily opted to appear in the leading female roles in hero-centric Tamil as well as Telugu films, such as comedy family drama Seethamma Vakitlo Sirimalle Chettu (2013), action drama Attarintiki Daredi (2013),  fantasy-drama Manam (2014), and action comedy Rabhasa (2014); and the Tamil-language action-drama Anjaan (2014), social action Kaththi (2014), and  action-drama 10 Endrathukulla (2014). This film, along with Theri, 24 (both 2016), and Mersal (2017) earned her nominations for the Filmfare Award for Best Tamil Actress. Her work in the Telugu film A Aa (2016) won her a fourth Filmfare Award.

Samantha made her OTT debut with the Amazon Prime Video web series,  The Family Man ( Season 2 ) in 2021, in which she played the antagonist as a Tamil militant rebel. It brought her huge critical acclaim and critics and audiences heaped praise on her performance. It fetched her several awards, including an IFFM award. In 2021, Samantha is signed to star in Arrangements of Love, a Philip John's directorial.

Samantha is the recipient of several awards, including four Filmfare Awards South, one Filmfare OTT Award, two Andhra Pradesh State Nandi Awards, six South Indian International Movie Awards, three CineMAA Awards and one Indian Film Festival of Melbourne Awards.

Film

Music videos

Television

See also 
 List of awards and nominations received by Samantha Ruth Prabhu

Footnotes

References

External links 
 
 Samantha Ruth Prabhu on Bollywood Hungama
 

Indian filmographies
Actress filmographies